James Law Bullions (12 March 1924 – June 2014) was a Scottish professional footballer who played as a wing half.

Career
Born in Dennyloanhead, Bullions spent his early career as an amateur at Chesterfield and Clowne, before playing in the Football League for Derby County, Leeds United and Shrewsbury Town. He later played non-league football for Worksop Town, Gresley Rovers, Sutton Town, Matlock Town and Alfreton Town, also managing the latter club.

Bullions died in Barlborough, Derbyshire in June 2014, at the age of 90.

References

1924 births
2014 deaths
Scottish footballers
Scottish football managers
Chesterfield F.C. players
Derby County F.C. players
Leeds United F.C. players
Shrewsbury Town F.C. players
Worksop Town F.C. players
Gresley F.C. players
Sutton Town A.F.C. players
Matlock Town F.C. players
Alfreton Town F.C. players
English Football League players
Alfreton Town F.C. managers
Association football wing halves
FA Cup Final players
People from Falkirk (council area)